Sodag is a small Village/hamlet in Khunti Block in Khunti District of Jharkhand State, India. It comes under Ganeor Panchayath. It is located south of District headquarters Khunti and 32 km from State capital Ranchi.

History

Geography

Demographics

Transportation

Nearby places

References

Villages in Khunti district